Isla de Pascua Province (Easter Island Province) is a Chilean province, an administrative division located within the Valparaíso Region. It has a 163,6 km² area and a population of 5761 inhabitants. The provincial capital is Hanga Roa. Besides Easter Island, the island comprises the small and uninhabited Isla Salas y Gómez, located hundreds of kilometers east of Easter Island. It is the only Chilean province located in Oceania and has a "special regime" status, with similar attributions to regional governments.

Communes 
The province includes only one commune: Isla de Pascua.

Authorities

Province governor (1976-2021)

Presidential provincial delegate (2021-present)

See also 

 Isla de Pascua Department

References 

Easter Island
Provinces of Valparaíso Region